Defending champions Cara Black and Liezel Huber defeated Květa Peschke and Rennae Stubbs in the final, 6–1, 7–5 to win the doubles tennis title at the 2008 WTA Tour Championships.

Seeds

Draw

Draw

External links
Draw

WTA Tour Championships - Doubles
Doubles